Hicham Abou Sleiman is a Lebanese actor and voice actor.

Filmography

Film

Khallet Warde. 2011

Television

Noktit Hob. 2010

Plays

Waylon Le Omma. 2013

Dubbing roles
M.I. High
Prophet Joseph - Milisavoo

References

http://www.anaemraa.com/أخبار-المشاهير/25988-هشام-ونور-تزوجا-ولكن-لماذا-لفتت-قصتهما-نظر-العالم؟.html
https://www.annahar.com/article/218101-هشام-أبو-سليمان-يبحث-عن-عروس
http://bisara7a.com/الممثل-هشام-ابو-سليمان-كشف-تجربته-السو/
http://www.almawed.com/article/حوارات-وتحقيقات/هشام-أبو-سليمان-المنتجون-لا-يجدونني-في-الدور-الأول
http://telive.net/Media/Person/216349/هشام-ابو-سليمان
http://www.elfann.com/news/show/1097240/هشام-أبو-سليمان-أندم-يوما-على-عمل-شاركت-فيه
http://www.elfann.com/news/show/1134594/هشام-أبو-سليمان-الفن-الدراما-المشتركة-أعادتنا-إلى-
http://www.elfann.com/news/show/1126804/هشام-أبو-سليمان-يوج-صرخة-إلى-المنتجين
http://www.elfann.com/news/show/1097148/هشام-أبو-سليمان-شخص-يقدرني-أضعه-فوق-راسي
http://www.akhbarak.net/news/2014/09/12/4987981/articles/16342839/هشام-أبو-سليمان-أي-شخص-يقدرني-أضعه-فوق-راسي
http://www.imdb.com/name/nm8274435/
http://www.mobygames.com/developer/hicham-abou-sleiman/credits/developerId,762508/
http://www.elcinema.com/person/1100923

External links

Living people
Lebanese male actors
Lebanese male stage actors
Lebanese male voice actors
21st-century Lebanese male actors
Lebanese male television actors
Year of birth missing (living people)